The Paine Estate is a historic estate at 325 Heath Street in Brookline, Massachusetts.  The mansion on the expansive estate was built by Walter Channing Cabot for his daughter Ruth and son-in-law Robert Treat Paine, Jr.  It is a Jacobethan style Medieval Revival structure built of brick, with Flemish end gables, limestone sills and lintels, and egg-and-dart panels.  It is one of the last estates, of what was once a whole series, which lined Heath Streat.  The only other to remain (albeit no longer in private hands) is Roughwood, now the campus of Pine Manor College.

The property was listed on the National Register of Historic Places in 1985.

See also
National Register of Historic Places listings in Brookline, Massachusetts

References

Houses completed in 1893
Houses in Brookline, Massachusetts
National Register of Historic Places in Brookline, Massachusetts
Houses on the National Register of Historic Places in Norfolk County, Massachusetts